Shwood Eyewear is an American brand of sunglasses and eyeglasses, it was founded in 2009, and is based in Portland, Oregon.

History

The prototype wooden glasses were developed by Eric Singer, the idea was then shared with Ryan Kirkpatrick, Daniel Genco, Taylor Murray and Philip Peterson. The prototype was made using madrone tree, a pair of rusty cabinet hinges and salvaged lenses from a thrift store.

Expansion
Shwood began its operations in a 7 x 15-ft. workspace, as soon as expansion became feasible they moved to a 30 x 50-ft. shop space. In 2010, they further expanded and moved to 6,000 square-foot facility in Portland.

The product line consists of sunglasses and prescription eyeglasses. The frames are made out of  wood, stone, acetate, titanium and brass.

References

External links
Official Website
Prescription Glasses
Glasses In The Movies

Eyewear retailers of the United States
American companies established in 2009
Manufacturing companies established in 2009
Retail companies established in 2009
Eyewear brands of the United States
Eyewear companies of the United States
Manufacturing companies based in Portland, Oregon
Privately held companies based in Oregon
2009 establishments in Oregon